Tanglefoot may refer to:

 Insect trap, a substance used on insect adhesive traps.
 Tanglefoot (band), a folk band from Ontario, Canada
 Tanglefoot, a beer brewed by Hall & Woodhouse
 Tanglefoot Seaplane Base, a seaplane base in Idaho, United States
 Tanglefoot Peak, a rocky peak in Antarctica
 Tanglefoot beech, the common name of Nothofagus gunnii
 Mieszko I Tanglefoot, a former High Duke of Poland
 Tanglefoot walking tracks, walking tracks in the Toolangi State Forest
 Camp Tanglefoot, a 1999 film
 Tanglefoot Trail, a rail trail in Mississippi